Scipione Angelini (1661–1729) was an Italian painter of the Baroque period, best known for still-lifes. He was born and active in Ascoli.

References

People from the Province of Ascoli Piceno
1661 births
1729 deaths
17th-century Italian painters
Italian male painters
18th-century Italian painters
Italian still life painters
Italian Baroque painters
18th-century Italian male artists